Stéphane Bonduel (30 November 1919 – 16 December 2021) was a French politician. A member of the European Democratic and Social Rally group, he served in the Senate from 1980 to 1989. He died on 16 December 2021, at the age of 102.

References

1919 births
2021 deaths
French Senators of the Fifth Republic
French expatriates in China
Politicians from Beijing
Senators of Charente-Maritime
French centenarians
Men centenarians